The 2021 Chattogram City Corporation election was an election in Chattogram, Bangladesh, held on 27 January 2021 to elect the 5th Mayor of Chittagong.

Results

References

2021 elections in Bangladesh
2021 in Bangladesh
Local elections in Bangladesh
Elections in Chittagong
January 2021 events in Bangladesh